Abū ʿAbd Allāh Muḥammad ibn Muʿādh al-Jayyānī (989, Cordova, Al-Andalus – 1079, Jaén, Al-Andalus) was an Arab, mathematician, Islamic scholar, and Qadi from Al-Andalus (in present-day Spain). Al-Jayyānī wrote important commentaries on Euclid's Elements and he wrote the first known treatise on spherical trigonometry.

Life 

Little is known about his life. Confusion exists over the identity of al-Jayyānī of the same name mentioned by ibn Bashkuwal (died 1183), Qur'anic scholar, Arabic Philologist, and expert in inheritance laws (farāʾiḍī). It is unknown whether they are the same person.

The book of unknown arcs of a sphere
Al-Jayyānī wrote The book of unknown arcs of a sphere, which is considered "the first treatise on spherical trigonometry", although spherical trigonometry in its ancient Hellenistic form was dealt with by earlier mathematicians such as Menelaus of Alexandria, who developed Menelaus' theorem to deal with spherical problems. However, E. S. Kennedy points out that while it was possible in pre-Islamic mathematics to compute the magnitudes of a spherical figure, in principle, by use of the table of chords and Menelaus' theorem, the application of the theorem to spherical problems was very difficult in practice. Al-Jayyānī's work on spherical trigonometry "contains formulae for right-handed triangles, the general law of sines, and the solution of a spherical triangle by means of the polar triangle." This treatise later had a "strong influence on European mathematics", and his "definition of ratios as numbers" and "method of solving a spherical triangle when all sides are unknown" are likely to have influenced Regiomontanus.

See also 
List of Arab scientists and scholars
Islamic mathematics

Notes

References 
 (PDF version)

989 births
1079 deaths
Astronomers from al-Andalus
Mathematicians from al-Andalus
11th-century mathematicians
11th-century people from al-Andalus
Scientists who worked on qibla determination
Mathematicians who worked on Islamic inheritance